The Maine Antique Digest (M.A.D.) is an American newspaper covering antiques founded by Samuel Pennington in 1973.  A trade newspaper, it is regarded as an important publication in the American and Canadian antiques market.

References

Hobby magazines published in the United States